Reino Adolf Valkama (4 April 1906 – 9 August 1962) was a Finnish actor. He appeared in 75 films during his career while also working for several theatres. In the 1930s, he was the manager of Mikkeli Theatre.

Valkama received the Pro Finlandia award in 1957. Actress Ritva Valkama (born 1932) is his daughter.

Selected filmography

Rikas tyttö (1939)
Morsian yllättää (1941)
Linnaisten vihreä kamari (1945)
"Minä elän" (1946)
Kesäillan valssi (1951)
A Night in Rio (1951)
Ryysyrannan Jooseppi (1955)
Rakas varkaani (1957)
Nuoruus vauhdissa (1961)

References

External links

Finnish male film actors
1906 births
1962 deaths
20th-century Finnish male actors